The Reed Bridge, near Marysville, Ohio, was a Partridge truss covered bridge.  It was listed on the National Register of Historic Places in 1975.

It was a single-span wooden bridge which spanned Big Darby Creek.

It was the longest covered bridge in Union County.

It was located 3.5 miles south of Marysville off State Route 38 in Darby Township, Union County, Ohio.  It was bypassed by Route 38 in the 1960s.  The bridge collapsed on August 19, 1993.

References

Covered bridges in Ohio
National Register of Historic Places in Union County, Ohio